The traditional star name Rucbah (from the Arabic word ركبة rukbah meaning "knee") has been applied to three different stars:
 Alpha Aquarii in the constellation Aquarius (this star is now called Sadalmelik by the IAU)
 Delta Cassiopeiae in the constellation Cassiopeia (this star is now called Ruchbah by the IAU)
 Alpha Sagittarii in the constellation Sagittarius (this star is now called Rukbat by the IAU, but was sometimes known as Al Rami)

Lists of stars